Cleveland Metro can refer to:

Greater Cleveland, the metropolitan area surrounding and including Cleveland, Ohio.
RTA Rapid Transit, a system consisting of rapid transit and light rail serving Cleveland, Ohio.